Lena Sandin (born 8 June 1961) is a former professional tennis player from Sweden.

Biography
Sandin won the girls' singles title at the 1979 French Open, with a win in the final over American Mary-Lou Piatek.

She represented the Sweden Fed Cup team in a total of six ties, the first in 1979. This included the quarter-final loss to Australia in 1980, where she gave Sweden a winning start by beating Dianne Fromholtz in the opening singles rubber.

At the 1980 US Open she took a set off the second seeded Martina Navratilova in a first-round loss.

She won a doubles title at Hamburg in 1982, partnering countrywoman Elisabeth Ekblom.

WTA Tour finals

Doubles (1-0)

References

External links
 
 
 

1961 births
Living people
Swedish female tennis players
French Open junior champions
Grand Slam (tennis) champions in girls' singles
20th-century Swedish women
21st-century Swedish women